In 2019 there have been many attacks in Burkina Faso on both soldiers and civilians. These are contextualized by the ongoing Islamist insurgency in Burkina Faso.

Silgadji 
On 28 April 2019, a pastor, his two sons and two worshippers were killed at a Protestant church in Silgadji.

Sanmatenga Province 
On 12 May 2019, at least 20 attackers shot dead six people in a church in Dablo Department, Sanmatenga Province, Centre-Nord Region. They then set fire to the church, a shop and two vehicles.

On 8 September 2019 in the Sanmatenga Province, Burkina Faso. In the Barsalogho Department a vehicle transporting people and goods, that was returning from a market, drove over an improvised explosive device (IED). 15 passengers were killed and six were injured in the IED attack. Most of the victims were traders. Meanwhile, around 50 km to the east, a convoy with vans carrying provisions for people displaced by fighting was attacked by gunmen. In this attack, 14 people were killed. It is unknown who carried out this attacks.

Oudalan Province 
The attack on the Burkina Faso Mosque occurred on the evening of Friday, 11 October 2019 in a mosque in northern Burkina Faso which left 16 people dead and two injured. It happened while the residents were praying inside the Grand Mosque in Salmossi, a village close to the border with Mali. AFP reported that 13 people died on the spot while 3 died later due to the injuries.

Pobé Mengao 
A mass shooting in Pobé Mengao killed 16 civilians.

Fada N’Gourma Department 

On 6 November 2019, gunmen ambushed a convoy transporting workers of the Canadian mining firm Semafo near the city of Fada N’Gourma, on a road to the firm's Boungou mine. At least 37 people were killed, and dozens more are missing or injured.

Hantoukoura 
On 1 December 2019, 14 people were killed at a Protestant church in Hantoukoura, Est Region.

Arbinda 
On 24 December 2019, a large group of militants on motorcycles attacked civilians and a military base in Arbinda, Soum Province, Burkina Faso. The attack and subsequent battle lasted several hours, resulting in the deaths of 35 civilians, 7 soldiers and 80 attackers. The attack was one of Burkina Faso's deadliest. A 48-hour state of mourning was declared after the attack.

References

2019 murders in Burkina Faso
Terrorist incidents in Burkina Faso in 2019
Jihadist insurgency in Burkina Faso